Patsy & Loretta is a 2019 biographical drama television film directed by Callie Khouri. The screenplay by Angelina Burnett is based on the friendship between country singers Patsy Cline and Loretta Lynn. The cast is led by Megan Hilty, Jessie Mueller, Janine Turner, and Kyle Schmid.

The film first aired on Lifetime on October 19, 2019. The film was nominated for Best Movie at the 10th Critics' Choice Television Awards. Megan Hilty and Jessie Mueller were also both nominated for Best Actress in a TV Movie.

Plot

Country singers Patsy Cline (Megan Hilty) and Loretta Lynn (Jessie Mueller) meet when the former was already a well known star. The film starts in 1957, showing the two singers in their separate lives each with their own families.

They meet in 1961 after Patsy was hospitalized due to a serious automobile accident. Already a star, Patsy helped Loretta, who was just starting in her career, giving advice on contracts and even gave her tips on costumes and makeup. They develop a friendship, until the fatal airplane crash in 1963.

Loretta is seen several years later in performance with the "ghost" of Patsy.

Cast

Production
The film was shot in Nashville, Tennessee. The executive producer, Neil Meron, had also worked with Hilty on the TV series Smash in 2012-13. Co-producers were Loretta Lynn's daughter Pasty Lynn Russell and Patsy Cline's daughter Julie Fudge on behalf of Patsy Cline's Estate. Megan Hilty and Jessie Mueller were cast in the lead roles.

Reception
Matt Roush wrote that the film is a "...brisk, sweet, touching and, naturally, tuneful tribute to female friendship... Megan Hilty ... gives a wonderfully robust performance as the outspoken and driven Patsy... It's inspiring and terrifically enjoyable watching Patsy, a force of musical nature, take the less worldly Loretta under her wing.... Still, the movie can be a bit sketchy as it races through their professional and personal lives."

References

External links
 
 
 

Lifetime (TV network) films
2019 television films
2019 films
Cultural depictions of Patsy Cline
Films directed by Callie Khouri